The Great Accident is a 1920 American silent drama film directed by Harry Beaumont and starring Tom Moore, Jane Novak and Willard Louis.

Cast
 Tom Moore as Wint Chase
 Jane Novak as Joan Caretall
 Andrew Robson as Winthrop Chase
 Willard Louis as Amos Caretall
 Lillian Langdon as Mrs. Winthrop Chase
 Ann Forrest as Hetty Morfee
 Philo McCullough as Jack Routt
 Otto Hoffman as V.R. Kite
 Roy Laidlaw as Peter Gergeu
 Edward McWade as Williams
 Don Bailey as Sheriff
 Maurice 'Lefty' Flynn as Sam O'Brien

References

Bibliography
 Langman, Larry. American Film Cycles: The Silent Era. Greenwood Publishing, 1998.

External links
 

1920 films
1920 drama films
1920s English-language films
American silent feature films
Silent American drama films
American black-and-white films
Films directed by Harry Beaumont
Goldwyn Pictures films
1920s American films